is the 25th single by Japanese duo Pink Lady, released on May 5, 2003. Written by longtime Pink Lady songwriters Shunichi Tokura and Yū Aku, the song was recorded for NHK's  as part of the network's 50th anniversary celebration. The music video for the song features CGI animated versions of the duo.

The song peaked at No. 183 on Oricon's singles chart.

Track listing 
All lyrics are written by Yū Aku; all music is composed and arranged by Shunichi Tokura.

Chart positions

References

External links
 (Teichiku Records)
 (NHK)

2003 singles
2003 songs
Pink Lady (band) songs
Japanese-language songs
Japanese children's songs
Songs with lyrics by Yū Aku
Songs with music by Shunichi Tokura
Minna no Uta